Jacob M. Landau (20 March 1924 – 12 November 2020) was Professor Emeritus in the Department of Political Science (in the field of Middle Eastern Studies) at the Hebrew University of Jerusalem.

Biography 
Landau was born on 20 March 1924 in Chișinău, Bessarabia (modern Moldova), which he left in 1935, moving to Palestine with his parents, Miriam and Michael Landau.  They settled in Tel Aviv, where he studied at the Herzliya Gymnasium, ending his school career in 1942.  He took his B.A. and M.A. in 1942–1946 at the Hebrew University of Jerusalem in history and Arabic studies.  His M.A. thesis researched the nationalist movement in modern Egypt.  It was supervised by Professor Richard Michael Koebner.  For his Ph.D. studies he went to the School of Oriental and African Studies in London.  His Ph.D. dissertation there was on parliaments and parties in Egypt (published in book form in 1953).  His supervisor was Professor Bernard Lewis.

Returning to Israel in 1949, he first taught history and the Arabic language at the Hebrew University's experimental high school from 1949 to 1958, interrupting this to take up a post-doctoral fellowship at Harvard University with Professor H. A. R. Gibb in 1955–1956.  During that year he was also visiting lecturer in modern Middle East history at Brandeis University.

Academic career
In 1958 he joined the Hebrew University's department of political science where he lectured until 1993 when he left as a full professor emeritus.  During those years he also served as a part-time professor of political science at Bar-Ilan University in Ramat-Gan, Israel, in addition to the Hebrew University. He also served as visiting professor at foreign universities in the United States, the United Kingdom, France, Germany, the Netherlands and Turkey.

Landau was one of the founders of the Israel Oriental Society in 1949 and served as its first secretary.  Member of the Israel Association of Political Science and its president in 1993–1998.  Also member of the Centre International des Etudes Pré-Ottomanes et Ottomanes (Paris), honorary member of the Turkish Historical Society (Ankara) and others.  Member of the editorial board of several journals and of the central editorial committee of the Encyclopedia Judaica, 2nd edition.

Awards and recognition
Research prizes by the Ben Zvi Institute (Jerusalem), Itzhak Grünbaum (Tel-Aviv), silver medals from Boğaziçi University (Istanbul) and the Turkish Historical Society (Ankara), and the Israel Prize in Middle Eastern Research (2005).

Research 
Landau's main themes of research are Ottoman and Middle Eastern ideologies and nationalist movements, political radicalism, minorities, pan-Islam, pan-Turkism, politics and language in Central Asia.  His published works are 23 books (selected list below).  He has also edited 12 books and has written numerous book-reviews in specialized journals and various encyclopedias.  His books and articles were published in ten different languages:  Hebrew, Arabic, Turkish, English, French, German, Greek, Italian, Russian and Chinese (see his Bibliography of Published Works, 2015).

Published works 
 Parliaments and Parties in Egypt. Jerusalem: The Israel Oriental Society, 1953. Second edition, New York: Praeger, 1954. Also in Arabic, Cairo and Beirut: 1975.
 Studies in the Arab Theater. Philadelphia: University of Pennsylvania Press, 1958. Also in French, Paris: 1965. Also in Arabic, Cairo: 1972.
 A Word Count of Modern Arabic Prose. New York: American Council of Learned Societies, 1959.
 The Israeli Communist Party and the Elections for the Fifth Knesset, 1961. Stanford, CA: The Hoover Institution, 1956 (=Hoover Institution Studies, 9) (with Professor M.M. Czudnowski).
 Jews in Nineteenth-Century Egypt. New York: New York University Press, 1969. Also in Hebrew, Jerusalem: 1967.	
 Arabische Literaturgeschichte. Zürich: Artemis Verlag, 1968. Also in Hebrew, Tel Aviv, 1970. Also in Turkish, Ankara: 1994. Second edition, (T.C. Kültür Bakanlığı Yayınları), 2002 (with Professor H.A.R. Gibb).
 The Arabs in Israel: A Political Study. London: Oxford University Press, under the Auspices of the Royal Institute of International Affairs, 1969, reprinted 1970. Also in Hebrew, Tel Aviv: 1971.
 The Hejaz Railway and the Muslim Pilgrimage: A Case of Ottoman Political Propaganda. Detroit, MI: Wayne State University Press, 1971.
 Middle Eastern Themes: Papers in History and Politics. London: Frank Cass, 1973.
 Radical Politics in Modern Turkey. Leiden: Brill, 1974. Also in Turkish, Ankara: 1978.
 Politics and Islam: The National Salvation Party in Turkey. Salt Lake City, Utah: The University of Utah, 1976.
 Abdul-Hamid's Palestine. London: André Deutsch, 1979. Also in Hebrew, Jerusalem: 1979.
 Pan-Turkism in Turkey: A Study of Irredentism. London: C. Hurst, 1981. Second enlarged edition, 1995. Also in Greek, Athens: 1985. Also in Chinese, Urumchi: 1992. Also in Turkish, Istanbul: 1999.
 Tekinalp, Turkish Patriot 1883–1961. Istanbul and Leiden: Nederlands Historisch-Archaeologisch Instituut, 1984. Also in Turkish, Istanbul: 1996.
 The Politics of Pan-Islam: Ideology and Organization. Oxford: Oxford University Press, 1990. Second edition, 1994. Also in Turkish, Istanbul: 1993.
 The Arab Minority in Israel, 1967–1991: Political Aspects. Oxford: Oxford University Press, 1993. Also in Hebrew, Tel Aviv: 1993.
 Arabisches Volkstheater in Kairo im Jahre 1909: Ahmad IlFār und seine Schwaenke. Beirut and Stuttgart: Steiner Verlag, 1993 (=Bibliotheca Islamica, 38) (with Professor M. Woidich).
 Jews, Arabs, Turks. Jerusalem: Magnes Press, 1993.
 Hebrew-Arabic Proverbs. Jerusalem and Tel-Aviv: Schocken, 1998 (with Dr. David Sagiv). Second edition, 2002.   
 The Politics of Language in the Ex-Soviet Muslim States (with Professor B. Kellner-Heinkele). Ann Arbor: University of Michigan Press, 2001. 
 Exploring Ottoman and Turkish History. London: Hurst, 2004.
 Language Politics in Contemporary Central Asia (with Professor B. Kellner-Heinkele). London: I.B. Tauris, 2012. Also in Russian, Moscow: 2015.

Bibliography 
Jacob M. Landau, Bibliography of published works.  J. M. Landau, Jerusalem: 2015 (690 items).

Mentioned In 
 Who's Who in World Jewry, 1965, New York
 Who's Who in Israel, 1966–67, Tel Aviv
 Who's Who in Israel, 2001, Tel-Aviv
 Contemporary Authors 1968, Detroit
 Dictionary of International Biography, 1968, London
 Marquis’ Who's Who in the World, Chicago
 Asia's Who's Who of Men and Women of Achievement, Delhi
 Türk Dili ve Edebiyatı Ansiklopedisi, 1985, Istanbul
 Guide to the Scholars of the History and Culture of Central Asia, 1995, Cambridge, MA
 2000 Outstanding Scholars of the Twentieth Century, 2000,  Cambridge, UK
 The International Directory of Distinguished Leadership, 2000, Raleigh, North Carolina
 The Contemporary Who's Who, 2003, Raleigh, North Carolina
 Encyclopaedia Judaica, Second edition, Volume 12, p. 463

External links 
Jacob M. Landau's curriculum vitae from the Israel Prize website (in Hebrew).
Professor Jacob M. Landau’s List of Publications, in the Hebrew University's website.
Scanned articles of Jacob M. Landau (insert "Jacob M Landau" in the Author / Names of Contributer box).

1924 births
2020 deaths
Moldovan Jews
Bessarabian Jews
Romanian emigrants to Mandatory Palestine
Israeli people of Moldovan-Jewish descent
Academic staff of the Hebrew University of Jerusalem
Israel Prize in Middle Eastern studies recipients
People from Chișinău